In mathematics, the real projective plane is an example of a compact non-orientable two-dimensional manifold; in other words, a one-sided surface.  It cannot be embedded in standard three-dimensional space without intersecting itself. It has basic applications to geometry, since the common construction of the real projective plane is as the space of lines in  passing through the origin.

The plane is also often described topologically, in terms of a construction based on the Möbius strip: if one could glue the (single) edge of the Möbius strip to itself in the correct direction, one would obtain the projective plane. (This cannot be done in three-dimensional space without the surface intersecting itself.) Equivalently, gluing a disk along the boundary of the Möbius strip gives the projective plane. Topologically, it has Euler characteristic 1, hence a demigenus (non-orientable genus, Euler genus) of 1.

Since the Möbius strip, in turn, can be constructed from a square by gluing two of its sides together with a half-twist, the real projective plane can thus be represented as a unit square (that is) with its sides identified by the following equivalence relations:
 for 

and
 for 

as in the leftmost diagram shown here.

Examples 
Projective geometry is not necessarily concerned with curvature and the real projective plane may be twisted up and placed in the Euclidean plane or 3-space in many different ways. Some of the more important examples are described below.

The projective plane cannot be embedded (that is without intersection) in three-dimensional Euclidean space. The proof that the projective plane does not embed in three-dimensional Euclidean space goes like this: Assuming that it does embed, it would bound a compact region in three-dimensional Euclidean space by the generalized Jordan curve theorem. The outward-pointing unit normal vector field would then give an orientation of the boundary manifold, but the boundary manifold would be the projective plane, which is not orientable. This is a contradiction, and so our assumption that it does embed must have been false.

The projective sphere
Consider a sphere, and let the great circles of the sphere be "lines", and let pairs of antipodal points be "points". It is easy to check that this system obeys the axioms required of a projective plane:

any pair of distinct great circles meet at a pair of antipodal points; and
any two distinct pairs of antipodal points lie on a single great circle.

If we identify each point on the sphere with its antipodal point, then we get a representation of the real projective plane in which the "points" of the projective plane really are points.  This means that the projective plane is the quotient space of the sphere obtained by partitioning the sphere into equivalence classes under the equivalence relation ~,  where x ~ y if y = x or y = −x. This quotient space of the sphere is homeomorphic with the collection of all lines passing through the origin in R3.

The quotient map from the sphere onto the real projective plane is in fact a two sheeted (i.e. two-to-one) covering map. It follows that the fundamental group of the real projective plane is the cyclic group of order 2; i.e., integers modulo 2. One can take the loop AB from the figure above to be the generator.

The projective hemisphere

Because the sphere covers the real projective plane twice, the plane may be represented as a closed hemisphere around whose rim opposite points are similarly identified.

Boy's surface – an immersion
The projective plane can be immersed (local neighbourhoods of the source space do not have self-intersections) in 3-space. Boy's surface is an example of an immersion.

Polyhedral examples must have at least nine faces.

Roman surface

Steiner's Roman surface is a more degenerate map of the projective plane into 3-space, containing a cross-cap.

A polyhedral representation is the tetrahemihexahedron, which has the same general form as Steiner's Roman Surface, shown here.

Hemi polyhedra
Looking in the opposite direction, certain abstract regular polytopes – hemi-cube, hemi-dodecahedron, and hemi-icosahedron – can be constructed as regular figures in the projective plane; see also projective polyhedra.

Planar projections
Various planar (flat) projections or mappings of the projective plane have been described. In 1874 Klein described the mapping:
 

Central projection of the projective hemisphere onto a plane yields the usual infinite projective plane, described below.

Cross-capped disk
A closed surface is obtained by gluing a disk to a cross-cap. This surface can be represented parametrically by the following equations:

where both u and v range from 0 to 2π.

These equations are similar to those of a torus.  Figure 1 shows a closed cross-capped disk.

A cross-capped disk has a plane of symmetry which passes through its line segment of double points.  In Figure 1 the cross-capped disk is seen from above its plane of symmetry z = 0, but it would look the same if seen from below.

A cross-capped disk can be sliced open along its plane of symmetry, while making sure not to cut along any of its double points.  The result is shown in Figure 2.

Once this exception is made, it will be seen that the sliced cross-capped disk is homeomorphic to a self-intersecting disk, as shown in Figure 3.

The self-intersecting disk is homeomorphic to an ordinary disk.  The parametric equations of the self-intersecting disk are:

where u ranges from 0 to 2π and v ranges from 0 to 1.

Projecting the self-intersecting disk onto the plane of symmetry (z = 0 in the parametrization given earlier) which passes only through the double points, the result is an ordinary disk which repeats itself (doubles up on itself).

The plane z = 0 cuts the self-intersecting disk into a pair of disks which are mirror reflections of each other.  The disks have centers at the origin.

Now consider the rims of the disks (with v = 1).  The points on the rim of the self-intersecting disk come in pairs which are reflections of each other with respect to the plane z = 0.

A cross-capped disk is formed by identifying these pairs of points, making them equivalent to each other. But this means that pairs of opposite points on the rim of the (equivalent) ordinary disk are identified with each other; this is how a real projective plane is formed out of a disk. Therefore, the surface shown in Figure 1 (cross-cap with disk) is topologically equivalent to the real projective plane RP2.

Homogeneous coordinates

The points in the plane can be represented by homogeneous coordinates. A point has homogeneous coordinates [x : y : z], where the coordinates [x : y : z] and [tx : ty : tz] are considered to represent the same point, for all nonzero values of t.  The points with coordinates [x : y : 1] are the usual real plane, called the finite part of the projective plane, and points with coordinates [x : y : 0], called points at infinity or ideal points, constitute a line called the line at infinity.  (The homogeneous coordinates [0 : 0 : 0] do not represent any point.)

The lines in the plane can also be represented by homogeneous coordinates. A projective line corresponding to the plane  in R3 has the homogeneous coordinates (a : b : c). Thus, these coordinates have the equivalence relation (a : b : c) = (da : db : dc) for all nonzero values of d. Hence a different equation of the same line dax + dby + dcz = 0 gives the same homogeneous coordinates. 
A point [x : y : z] lies on a line (a : b : c) if ax + by + cz = 0.  
Therefore, lines with coordinates (a : b : c) where a, b are not both 0 correspond to the lines in the usual real plane, because they contain points that are not at infinity.  The line with coordinates (0 : 0 : 1) is the line at infinity, since the only points on it are those with z = 0.

Points, lines, and planes

A line in P2 can be represented by the equation ax + by + cz = 0. If we treat a, b, and c as the column vector ℓ and x, y, z as the column vector x then the equation above can be written in matrix form as:

xTℓ = 0 or ℓTx = 0.

Using vector notation we may instead write x ⋅ ℓ = 0 or ℓ ⋅ x = 0.

The equation k(xTℓ) = 0 (which k is a non-zero scalar) sweeps out a plane that goes through zero in R3 and k(x) sweeps out a line, again going through zero. The plane and line are linear subspaces in R3, which always go through zero.

Ideal points

If  we have a normalized homogeneous coordinate. All points that have z = 1 create a plane. Let's pretend we are looking at that plane (from a position further out along the z axis and looking back towards the origin) and there are two parallel lines drawn on the plane. From where we are standing (given our visual capabilities) we can see only so much of the plane, which we represent as the area outlined in red in the diagram. If we walk away from the plane along the z axis, (still looking backwards towards the origin), we can see more of the plane. In our field of view original points have moved. We can reflect this movement by dividing the homogeneous coordinate by a constant. In the adjacent image we have divided by 2 so the z value now becomes 0.5. If we walk far enough away what we are looking at becomes a point in the distance. As we walk away we see more and more of the parallel lines. The lines will meet at a line at infinity (a line that goes through zero on the plane at ). Lines on the plane when  are ideal points.

The homogeneous point  is where all the real points go when you're looking at the plane from an infinite distance, a line on the  plane is where parallel lines intersect.

Duality

In the equation  there are two column vectors. You can keep either constant and vary the other. If we keep the point x constant and vary the coefficients ℓ we create new lines that go through the point. If we keep the coefficients constant and vary the points that satisfy the equation we create a line. We look upon x as a point, because the axes we are using are x, y, and z. If we instead plotted the coefficients using axis marked a, b, c points would become lines and lines would become points. If you prove something with the data plotted on axis marked x, y, and z the same argument can be used for the data plotted on axis marked a, b, and c. That is duality.

Lines joining points and intersection of lines (using duality)
The equation  calculates the inner product of two column vectors. The inner product of two vectors is zero if the vectors are orthogonal. The cross product will find such a vector: the line joining two points has homogeneous coordinates given by the equation . The intersection of two lines may be found in the same way, using duality, as the cross product of the vectors representing the lines, .

Embedding into 4-dimensional space
The projective plane embeds into 4-dimensional Euclidean space.  The real projective plane P2(R) is the quotient of the two-sphere

S2 = {(x, y, z) ∈ R3 : x2 + y2 + z2 = 1}

by the antipodal relation . This map restricts to a map whose domain is S2 and, since each component is a homogeneous polynomial of even degree, it takes the same values in R4 on each of any two antipodal points on S2. This yields a map . Moreover, this map is an embedding. Notice that this embedding admits a projection into R3 which is the Roman surface.

Higher non-orientable surfaces
By gluing together projective planes successively we get non-orientable surfaces of higher demigenus.  The gluing process consists of cutting out a little disk from each surface and identifying (gluing) their boundary circles.  Gluing two projective planes creates the Klein bottle.

The article on the fundamental polygon describes the higher non-orientable surfaces.

See also
Real projective space
Projective space
Pu's inequality for real projective plane
Smooth projective plane

References

Coxeter, H.S.M. (1955), The Real Projective Plane, 2nd ed.  Cambridge: At the University Press.
Reinhold Baer, Linear Algebra and Projective Geometry, Dover, 2005

External links 
 
 Line field coloring using Werner Boy's real projective plane immersion
 The real projective plane on YouTube

Surfaces
Geometric topology